Alert Airport  is located at Alert, Nunavut, Canada, approximately  south of the true North Pole. It is operated by the Canadian Department of National Defence and is part of Canadian Forces Station Alert. A weather station was established on the site in 1950, and in 1957 construction began on the military facilities which are still in use to this day. It is the northernmost airport in the world.

Facilities

Radar and navigation equipment are trailer units that can be moved around the airport. The airport's fire and rescue operations are supported by a 2012 KME/Fort Garry Fire Truck ARFF. Two bulldozers are used to grade the runway when needed.

Incidents

There have been two crashes involving fatalities at the airfield since it was established.

 July 31, 1950 – Royal Canadian Air Force Avro Lancaster AG-965 on a re-supply flight crashed, killing all 9 on board (crew members and passengers).
 October 30, 1991 – "Boxtop 22", a Lockheed C-130 Hercules from CFB Trenton on re-supply mission crashed, killing 5 on board.

See also
 List of airports in Nunavut
 Thule Air Base US - Greenland

References

External links

Airports in the Arctic
Ellesmere Island
Military airbases in Nunavut
1950 establishments in Canada
Airports established in 1950